Nigeria competed at the 1956 Summer Olympics in Melbourne, Australia.

Results by event

Athletics

100 m 

Edward Ajado

Round 1: in the Heat 11 (rank 1) qualified for the quarterfinals, 10.8 seconds (hand-stopped), 11.01 seconds (automatically stopped)

 Quarterfinals: eliminated in the 3rd Run (rank 5), 10.9 seconds (hand-stopped), 11.02 seconds (automatically stopped)

Titus Erinle

1. Round: eliminated in the 2nd Run (rank 3), 10.9 seconds (hand-stopped), 11.09 seconds (automatically stopped)

Thomas Obi

1. Round: eliminated in the 7th Run (rank 5), 11.0 seconds (hand-stopped), 11.10 seconds (automatically stopped)

4 × 100 meters relay 

Edward Ajado, Abdul Amu, Titus Erinle and Rafiu Oluwa

Round one: eliminated in the 4th Run, 47.3 seconds (hand-stopped), 47.39 seconds (automatically stopped), disqualified

400 m 

Abdul Amu

1. Round: eliminated in the 3rd Run (rank 5), 49.4 seconds (hand-stopped), 49.57 seconds (automatically stopped)

Triple jump 

Paul Bamela Engo

Qualification round: 14.81 meters, qualified for the final

Try one: 14.81 meters

Try two: omitted

Try three: omitted

Final: 15.03 meters, rank 17

Try one: 14.98 meters

Try two: 15.03 meters

Try three: 14.87 meters

Peter Esiri

Qualification round: 14.93 meters, 16th place qualified for the final

Try one: 14.93 meters
Try two: omitted
Try three: omitted

Final round: no valid distance, rank 22

Try one: invalid
Try two: invalid
Try three: omitted

High jump 

Julius Chigbolu

Qualification round: 1.92 meters, rank 4, qualified for the final

1.70 meters: valid, without failed attempt

1.78 meters: omitted

1.82 meters: valid, without failed attempt

1.88 meters: omitted

1.92 meters: valid, without failed attempt

Final round: 2.00 meters, rank 9

1.80 meters: omitted

1.86 meters: valid, a failed attempt

1.92 meters: valid, two failed attempts

1.96 meters: valid, a failed attempt

2.00 meters: valid, without failed attempt

2.03 meters: invalid, three failed attempts

Vincent Gabriel

Qualification round: 1.92 meters, 22nd place qualified for the final

1.70 meters: valid, without failed attempt

1.78 meters: omitted

1.82 meters: omitted

1.88 meters: valid, two failed attempts

1.92 meters: valid, a failed attempt

Final round: 1.92 meters, rank 19

1.80 meters: valid, without failed attempt

1.86 meters: valid, without failed attempt

1.92 meters: valid, two failed attempts

1.96 meters: invalid, three failed attempts

Long jump 

Karim Olowu

Qualification round: 7.29 meters, rank 10, qualified for the final

Try one: 7.05 meters

Try two: 7.29 meters

Try three: omitted

Final round: 7.36 meters, rank 5

Try one: 7.28 meters

Try two: 6.77 meters

Try three: 7.36 meters

Try four: 6.42 meters

Try five: invalid

Attempt six: 6.91 meters

Rafiu Oluwa

Qualification round: 6.53 meters, rank 29

Try one: invalid

Try two: 6.53 meters

Try three: invalid

References
Official Olympic Reports
sports-reference

1956
Summer Olympics
1956 Summer Olympics
Nations at the 1956 Summer Olympics